Dundee in Forfarshire was a royal burgh that returned one commissioner to the Parliament of Scotland and to the Convention of Estates.

After the Acts of Union 1707, Dundee, Cupar, Forfar, Perth and St Andrews formed the Perth district of burghs (sometimes called Forfar Burghs), returning one member between them to the House of Commons of Great Britain.

List of burgh commissioners

 1643 (convention): Thomas Mudie  
 1643 (convention): Robert Davidson  
 1643 (convention): George Brown  
 1644: Thomas Haliburton 
 1645: James Sympson 
 1645–47, 1648–51, 1661–63: Alexander Wedderburn of Kingany, provost 
 1649, 1651: Robert Davidson 
 1650-51: Alexander Bower 
 1665 (convention): George Fletcher, dean of guild 
 1667 (convention): John Kinloch, merchant, bailie 
 1669–1674: George Forrester, merchant-burgess, councillor 
 1678 (convention): Alexander Wedderburn, provost 
 1681–82, 1702, 1702–07: John Scrymgeour of Kirktoun, provost 
 1685–86, 1689 (convention), 1689–1701: James Fletcher, provost  (died c.1701)

References

See also
 List of constituencies in the Parliament of Scotland at the time of the Union

Burghs represented in the Parliament of Scotland (to 1707)
Politics of the county of Forfar
History of Angus, Scotland
Constituencies disestablished in 1707
1707 disestablishments in Scotland
Politics of Dundee
History of Dundee